is a district located in Sōya Subprefecture, Hokkaido, Japan.

As of 2004, the district has an estimated population of 16,986 and a density of 8.87 persons per km2.

Towns and villages
Esashi
Hamatonbetsu
Nakatonbetsu

Merger
On March 20, 2006, the town of Utanobori merged into the town of Esashi.

Districts in Hokkaido